Igbo Etiti is a local government area of Enugu State, Nigeria. Its headquarters are in the town of Ogbede. It has an area of 325 km and a population of 209,248 at the 2006 census. The postal code of the area is 411.

Geography 
Igbo Etiti LGA is 325 square kilometers in size and has an average temperature of 27 degrees Celsius. The region has two primary seasons: dry and wet, with total recorded rainfall in the LGA averaging 1900 mm per year. In Igbo Etiti, the average wind speed is 10 km/h.

Economy 
Farming is a primary source of income in the Igbo Etiti LGA, with products including as yam, cassava, kolanut, and cocoyam being farmed in great amounts.  The LGA hosts a number of marketplaces where a range of goods are bought and sold, indicating that trade is booming in the region. Palm wine tapping, woodwork, and handcraft are other key economic activity in the Igbo Etiti LGA. Ibgo Etiti is known for Agriculture

Government

Wards 

 Aku I
 Aku Ii
 Aku Iii
 Aku Iv
 Aku V (idueme)
 Diogbe/umunko
 Ejuoha/udeme
 Ekwegbe I
 Ekwegbe Ii
 Ikolo/ohebe
 Ohaodo I
 Ohaodo Ii
 Onyohor/ochima/idoha
 Ozalla I
 Ozalla Ii
 Ukehe I
 Ukehe Ii
 Ukehe Iii
 Ukehe Iv
 Ukehe V

References

Local Government Areas in Enugu State
Local Government Areas in Igboland